Signal Hill is a hill in Esquimalt, British Columbia, Canada, located on the south side of Constance Cove in CFB Esquimalt.

See also
Signal Hill (disambiguation)
List of World War II-era fortifications on the British Columbia Coast

References

World War II sites in Canada
Greater Victoria
Hills of British Columbia